The 2018 Ivy League Baseball Championship Series was held at Yale Field on May 22 and May 23, 2018. Columbia swept the series and claimed the Ivy League's automatic berth in the 2018 NCAA Division I baseball tournament.

Results
Game One

Game Two

References

Ivy League Baseball Championship Series
Tournament